The 9th Senate district of Wisconsin is one of 33 districts in the Wisconsin State Senate.  Located in eastern Wisconsin, the district comprises most of Manitowoc and Sheboygan counties, as well as part of eastern Calumet County.

Current elected officials
Devin LeMahieu is the senator representing the 9th district. He was first elected in the 2014 general election.

Each Wisconsin State Senate district is composed of three Wisconsin State Assembly districts.  The 9th Senate district comprises the 25th, 26th, and 27th Assembly districts. The current representatives of those districts are: 
 Assembly District 25: Paul Tittl (R–Manitowoc)
 Assembly District 26: Terry Katsma (R–Oostburg)
 Assembly District 27: Amy Binsfeld (R–Mosel)

The district is also located within Wisconsin's 6th congressional district, which is represented by U.S. Representative Glenn Grothman.

Past senators
Note: the boundaries of districts have changed repeatedly over history. Previous politicians of a specific numbered district have represented a completely different geographic area, due to redistricting.

The district has previously been represented by:

Notes

External links
9th Senate District, Senator Leibham in the Wisconsin Blue Book (2005–2006)
Joe Leibham official campaign site

Wisconsin State Senate districts
Manitowoc County, Wisconsin
Sheboygan County, Wisconsin
Calumet County, Wisconsin
1848 establishments in Wisconsin